Phycisphaerae is a class of aquatic bacteria. They reproduce by budding and are found in samples of algae in marine water. Organisms in this group are spherical and have a holdfast, at the tip of a thin cylindrical extension from the cell body called the stalk, at the nonreproductive end that helps them to attach to each other during budding.

Phylogeny 
Phylogeny based on GTDB 07-RS207 by Genome Taxonomy Database

See also
 List of bacterial orders
 List of bacteria genera

References

Environmental microbiology
Planctomycetota